The 2017 Rugby Europe Sevens Conferences are the lower divisions of Rugby Europe's 2017 sevens season. Conference 1 was held in Burgas, Bulgaria, with the two top-placing teams advancing to the 2018 Trophy, while Conference 2 was held in Tallinn, Estonia, with the top two advancing to Conference 1 for 2018.

Conference 1

Will be held in Burgas, Bulgaria 1–2 July

Pool Stage

Pool A

Pool B

Pool C

Knockout stage

Challenge Trophy

5th Place

Cup

Conference 2

Played in Tallinn, Estonia 15–16 July

Pool Stage

Pool A

Pool B

Knockout stage

Challenge Trophy

Cup

References

Conferences
2017 rugby sevens competitions
2017 in Bulgarian sport
2017 in Estonian sport